Kano Municipal is a Local Government Area within the Kano Urban Area in Kano State, also known as capital of kano state, Nigeria. Its Secretariat  is at Kofar Kudu (western entrance of emir's palace), in the south of the city of Kano.

It has an area of 17 km and 13 wards with population of 365,525 at the 2006 census.

The postal code of the area is 700.

References

Local Government Areas in Kano State